State Road 173 (NM 173) is a  state highway in the US state of New Mexico. Its western terminus is at U.S. Route 550 (US 550) in Aztec, and its eastern terminus at the end of state maintenance at the NM 511 west of Navajo Dam.

Major intersections

See also

References

173
Transportation in San Juan County, New Mexico